The 2008–09 Houston Cougars women's basketball team, also known as the Houston Cougars, Houston, or UH, represented the University of Houston in the college basketball 2008-09 season.  It was their 65th year of season play.  The head coach for the Cougars was Joe Curl, who served in his 11th year in that position.  The team played its home games at Hofheinz Pavilion on-campus in Houston, Texas. The team finished the season with 19 wins. The Cougars were 12-2 at home, 6-6 on the road, and 1-2 in neutral site games.

Schedule

|-
!colspan=8|Exhibition

|-
!colspan=8|Regular season

|-
!colspan=8|St. John's-Chartwells Holiday Classic

|-
!colspan=8|Regular season

Conference USA tournament
March 6:Despite Courtney Taylor's team-high 19 points and nine rebounds, the University of Houston women's basketball team could not overcome a sluggish first half Friday, falling to UCF 79-66 in the quarterfinals of the Conference USA Championship at Fogelman Arena.

Awards and honors
Zane Jakobsone (Senior): Cougars Academic MVP
Courtney Taylor (Sophomore): Cougars Athletic MVP.

References

External links
Official Site 

Houston Cougars women's basketball seasons
Houston
Houston Cougars women's basketball
Houston Cougars women's basketball